A master builder or master mason is a central figure leading construction projects in pre-modern times (a precursor to the modern architect and engineer).

Historically, the term has generally referred to "the head of a construction project in the Middle Ages or Renaissance period", with an 1887 source describing the status as follows:

The term has also been applied to more broadly include "designers and builders of large-scale construction work who learned their trade in a more formal way than the builders of primitive forms in pre-technological societies... from the times of the Egyptians and Sumerians until (and in some cases beyond) the Industrial Revolution". The phrase has been in use since at least as early as 1610, when William Camden wrote in his  of "those Wings in Architecture, which the great Master builders tearme Peroma". Later in the same work, Camden writes:

Like other trades, master builders were initially trained through lengthy apprenticeships to persons already having that status, often beginning in boyhood, and the "secrets of the Master Builders were often jealously guarded, and treated as sacred knowledge". A 1926 source stated:

References

Construction and extraction occupations